Annie Williams (born 1942) is a watercolour artist who won the 2009 Turner Watercolour Award.

Biography
Born in London, the daughter of artist Ivor Williams and Elizabeth Pocock, Williams grew up in Wales and trained and worked as a nurse before studying Fine Art at City and Guilds from 1966 to 1969.

Her later work has been almost entirely still-life. She enjoys playing with shapes, pattern and colour, mixing the familiar with some abstraction, and precision with suggestion. Her foregrounds are a few simple objects, usually pots, and backgrounds are created from textiles or old newspaper cuttings, and even some unfinished paintings as a starting point.

She has had one-woman shows at the Baker Tilly Gallery, Grape Lane Gallery and University of Warwick. Awards include a travel scholarship to Florence, The Artist Magazine Award at the Mall Galleries, and various awards from the RWS open exhibition 21st Century Watercolour. Annie is a Member of the Royal Watercolour Society and a senior fellow of the Royal Society of Painter-Printmakers. She has regularly exhibited at the Royal Academy Summer Exhibition.

In 2013, her exhibition "Still Life: Prints and Watercolours" was held at the University of Aberystwyth.

References

External links
 images of Williams' work on Invaluable
 Artist and the Radio https://www.bbc.co.uk/radio4/inspiration/artist_annie_williams.shtml

1942 births
Living people
20th-century Welsh painters
21st-century Welsh painters
20th-century British women artists
21st-century British women artists
Artists from London
Women watercolorists
Welsh watercolourists
Welsh women painters